The  is a temple of the Tendai sect in Himeji, Hyōgo, Japan.

History 
It was founded by Shoku Shonin in 966.

The complex of buildings is at the top of Mt Shosha approximately 25 minutes by bus from Himeji Station. The mountain summit can be reached by either a one-mile hiking trail or Mt. Shosha Ropeway, and is often visited by pilgrims. Scenes from The Last Samurai were filmed there.

Engyō-ji is temple No. 27 in the Kansai Kannon Pilgrimage, following Ichijō-ji and preceding Nariai-ji.

Building list 
Bentendō
Daikōdō - Important Cultural Property of Japan. It was rebuilt in Muromachi period.
Daikokudō
Fudōdō
Gohōdō - Important Cultural Property of Japan. It was rebuilt in 1559.
Gohōdō haiden - It was rebuilt in 1589.
Gyōjadō
Hokkedō
Jikidō - Important Cultural Property of Japan. It was rebuilt in Muromachi period.
Jōgyōdō - Important Cultural Property of Japan. It was rebuilt in Muromachi period.
Jujiin
Jumyōin - Kyakuden, Kuri and Karamon is Important Cultural Property of Japan.
Juryōin - Important Cultural Property of Japan.
Kaizandō - Important Cultural Property of Japan. It was rebuilt in Edo period.
Kongodō - Important Cultural Property of Japan. It was rebuilt in Muromachi period.
Maniden - It was rebuilt in 1933.
Monjudō
Myōkōin
Sengakuin
Shōrō - Important Cultural Property of Japan. It was rebuilt in Kamakura period.
Yakushidō
Zuikōin

In media 
Engyō-ji was one of the locations of the movie the Last Samurai. In the picture it is the temple of Lord Katsumoto.

It was also one of the filming locations of Snake Eyes.

See also 
 For an explanation of terms concerning Japanese Buddhism, Japanese Buddhist art, and Japanese Buddhist temple architecture, see the Glossary of Japanese Buddhism.

References

External links 

Hyogo Tourism - Engyoji
Mt. Shosha - Engyoji (Japanese)
Official Himeji tourism website in English

966 establishments
10th-century establishments in Japan
Important Cultural Properties of Japan
Tendai temples
Buddhist temples in Himeji
Historic Sites of Japan